St. Barnabas Episcopal Church, later called Christ & St. Barnabas Episcopal Church, and now known as New Hope Missionary Baptist Church, is an historic Episcopal church and rectory at 2900 Fifth Avenue in Troy, Rensselaer County, New York.  The church was built in 1895 and is a red brick church in the Late Gothic Revival style.  It has a gable roof and three hipped dormers.  It has an open bell tower and slender conical turrets.  It features a rose window depicting the Madonna and Child.  The former rectory is a -story, L-shaped brick residence.  Also on the property is a contributing carved stone crucifixion dated to about 1900.

It was listed on the National Register of Historic Places in 2004.

References

Episcopal church buildings in New York (state)
Churches on the National Register of Historic Places in New York (state)
Gothic Revival church buildings in New York (state)
Churches completed in 1895
19th-century Episcopal church buildings
National Register of Historic Places in Troy, New York
Churches in Troy, New York
1895 establishments in New York (state)